Archischoenobius nigrolepis is a moth in the family Crambidae. It was described by Fu-Qiang Chen, Shi-Mei Song and Chun-Sheng Wu in 2007. It is found in the Chinese provinces of Hunan and Fujian.

References

Moths described in 2007
Schoenobiinae
Moths of Asia